Justin Harney is an American former ice hockey defenseman who was an All-American for St. Lawrence.

Career
Harney's college career began in the fall of 1996 and he began playing full-time for St. Lawrence as a freshman. As an underclassman, Harney provided steady production from the blueline but he was unable to help the Saints win many games. Things changed during his junior year; Harney's offensive numbers more than doubled while SLU won more than twice as many games as the year before. Harney helped the Larries reach the ECAC Hockey championship game and earn a bid to the NCAA Tournament for the first time since 1992. As a senior, Harney was named team captain and led the Saints to one of their best seasons in history. While his offensive numbers declined slightly, Harney led the team to a first place finish in the conference standings and then won the 2000 ECAC championship. St. Lawrence received the second eastern seed and were advanced into the national quarterfinals. They faced down Boston University in an epic 4-overtime match and won the game to send the Saints into just their second Frozen Four over the previous 38 seasons. The team's run ended in the national semifinals with Harney being named an All-American for the year.

After graduating, Harney signed professionally with the Pittsburgh Penguins' organization but ended his first year in the Anaheim Mighty Ducks farm system. By the end of his second season as a pro, Harney had spent time with six different teams. He decided to head to Europe for his third season and spend the succeeding five years playing in Germany. Harney retired in 2007.

A year after ending his playing career, Harney began attending the F.W. Olin Graduate School of Business at Babson College. After graduating in 2010, he became the director of Sales and Marketing for Professional Nursing Placement Services. As of 2021, he continues to work in the same position.

Personal life
Both of Justin's older brothers played college hockey as well. Joe, for Boston College, and Jake for St. Lawrence.

Statistics

Regular season and playoffs

Awards and honors

References

External links

1977 births
Living people
AHCA Division I men's ice hockey All-Americans
American men's ice hockey defensemen
Ice hockey people from Massachusetts
People from Hopkinton, Massachusetts
Sportspeople from Middlesex County, Massachusetts
St. Lawrence Saints men's ice hockey players
Wheeling Nailers players
Charlotte Checkers (1993–2010) players
Cincinnati Mighty Ducks players
Wilkes-Barre/Scranton Penguins players
Lowell Lock Monsters players
Saint John Flames players
Iserlohn Roosters players
ERC Ingolstadt players
Kassel Huskies players